Karsteniomyces is a genus of lichenicolous fungi of unknown familial, ordinal, and class placement in the Ascomycota. The genus was circumscribed by David Leslie Hawksworth in 1980. The species of this genus are found in Europe.

The genus name of Karsteniomyces is in honour of Petter Adolf Karsten (1834–1917), who was a Finnish born mycologist.

The genus was circumscribed by David Leslie Hawksworth in Bull. Brit. Mus. (Nat. Hist.) vol.9 (Issue 1) on page 22 in 1981.

Species known;.
Karsteniomyces llimonae 
Karsteniomyces peltigerae 
Karsteniomyces tuberculosus  – Greenland

References

Ascomycota enigmatic taxa
Taxa described in 1980
Taxa named by David Leslie Hawksworth
Ascomycota genera